Dutch Michiganders are residents of the state of Michigan who are of Dutch ancestry. In the 1840s, Calvinist immigrants desiring more religious freedom immigrated. West Michigan in particular has become associated with Dutch American culture, and the highly conservative influence of the Dutch Reformed Church, centering on the cities of Holland and (to a lesser extent) Grand Rapids. Dutch is still spoken by the elderly and their children in Western Michigan. As of 2010, 5.1% of Michiganders are of Dutch descent.

See also
 De Zwaan (windmill)
 Gazette van Detroit
 Holland, Michigan
 Holland Museum
 Tulip Time Festival

References

External links
 The Western Michigan Dutch
 Dutch Speakers in Michigan, YouTube